Ius indigenatus (Latin for "right of local birth") is a right which was from the 15th to the 18th century a requirement for people to hold royal office in Royal Prussia, a Polish province. It limited offices and land ownership to local Prussian natives.

It was confirmed in 1466 by the Second Peace of Thorn which secured a large decree of autonomy for Royal Prussia. The Prussian Ius indigenatus was valid for both parts of Prussia separated in 1466, the western part, later called Royal Prussia, and the eastern part, from 1525 the Duchy of Prussia, later East Prussia.

See also
Jus soli
Jus sanguinis
Indygenat

References 
 Karin Friedrich, The Other Prussia. Royal Prussia, Poland and Liberty, 1569–1772, Cambridge, 2000,  
 Michael G. Müller, Zweite Reformation und Städtische Autonomie im Königlichen Preußen. Danzig, Elbing und Thorn in der Epoche der Konfessionalisierung (1557–1660), Berlin 1998, 
 Hans-Jürgen Bömelburg, Zwischen polnischer Ständegesellschaft und preußischem Obrigkeitsstaat. Vom Königlichen Preußen zu Westpreußen (1756–1806), München 1995, 

Latin legal terminology
German nationality law
Prussian law
Royal Prussia
Duchy of Prussia